Sang Hyang Kamahayanikan is part of the prose literature of Javanese people. This Tantric Buddhist treatise describes Javanese Buddhism, architecture and iconography. The back side of this literature contain a name of Javanese king, i.e. Mpu Sindok, which is throned at East Java from 929 to 947 CE.

In his dissertation, Dr. Noehardi Magetsari (2000) mentioned that the structure of Borobudur actually shows the developmental stages of a yogi experiences to achieve Buddhahood where feelings and thoughts stop. Borobudur's popular term of Kamadhatu, Rupadhatu, Arupadhatu are also contained in Sanghyang Kamahayanikan.

History
It was written about 929-947 CE by Mpu Shri Sambhara Surya Warama from East Java, the successor of the Mataram Kingdom which was shifted to East Java. The oldest literature was found on Lombok Island in 1900. Professor Yunboll discussed it on 1908 and then it was translated into Dutch by J.deKatt in 1940. Later on it was inspected by Professor Wuff. This literature was translated into Indonesian by I Gusti Bagus Sugriwa. The last process in the translation was done by "Translation Team of Buddhist Scriptures Ditura Buddha, Indonesian Ministry of Religious Affairs."

Contents
This literature contains Mahayana (especially Vajrayana) Buddhism teachings, mostly about the list of deities found in Mahayana Buddhism- which is often matched with the placement of the Buddhist kings in the Borobudur temple. The literature also contains the procedures in meditation.

According to D.K. Widya, Sanghyang Kamahayanikan teaches how one can attain Buddhahood, i.e. a student must first practice Pāramitā, then described Paramaguhya and Mahaguhya. As an addition, it also explained the philosophy of Adwaya that overcoming the dualism "existence" and "non-existence". In the book there is a very detailed description of how a tantric yogi prepare himself for spiritual path, from the start until the implementation of multilevel worships. It is said that the Vajrayana doctrines is meditation towards Five Tathagata. By worshipping them, a yogi can attain the purity of mind.

Popular culture
The Sang Hyang Kamahayanikan Award is an award of Borobudur Writers and Cultural Festival for any individual or groups who have been responsible and has contributed greatly to the cultural and historical assessment of Indonesia. The award mainly conferred to Indonesian or international historians, writers, archaeologists, cultural, historical background author, playwright, puppeteer, clergy, philologist, and so on.

See also
Mahāyāna sūtras
A Record of Buddhist Practices Sent Home from the Southern Sea

References

External links
Sanghyang-kamahayanikan

Mahayana texts
Javanese culture